Tryznovo is a rural locality (a village) in Tolshmenskoye Rural Settlement, Totemsky District, Vologda Oblast, Russia. The population was 9 as of 2002.

Geography 
Tryznovo is located 79 km south of Totma (the district's administrative centre) by road. Surovtsovo is the nearest rural locality.

References 

Rural localities in Tarnogsky District